Kassian A. Kovalcheck (March 31, 1907 –  October 26, 1969) was an American football player and coach.  He served as the head football coach at Duquesne University from 1947 to 1948, compiling a record of 4–15.  Kovalcheck played college football as a fullback at Duquesne from 1927 to 1930.  He died at the age of 62, on October 26, 1969, after suffering from heart attack while driving near Irwin, Pennsylvania.

Head coaching record

College

References

External links
 

1907 births
1969 deaths
American football fullbacks
Duquesne Dukes football coaches
Duquesne Dukes football players
Jacksonville Naval Air Station Flyers football coaches
High school basketball coaches in the United States
High school football coaches in Pennsylvania
High school football coaches in Wisconsin
United States Navy personnel of World War II
United States Navy officers
People from California, Pennsylvania
Coaches of American football from Pennsylvania
Players of American football from Pennsylvania
Military personnel from Pennsylvania